Haisam Rida  is a Ghanaian submission grappler and black belt Brazilian jiu-jitsu competitor. A two-time Asian Open Champion and three-time JBJJF All Japan Champion in lower belt divisions, Rida is an ADCC 2022 Veteran and a black belt Pan-American No-GI silver medallist.

Early life
Haisam Rida was born on 25 July 1993 in Accra, Ghana. He moved to Tokyo with his family at age 15. He started Brazilian jiu-jitsu (BJJ) in September 2010 in Kanagawa under Yamada Shigetaka, from who he received all his belts from white to brown. In 2016 he joined Carpe Diem Academy in Tokyo where he received his black belt from Yuki Ishikawa in 2018. In November 2020 Rida left Japan for Michigan, USA where he joined Assembly Jiu Jitsu.

Career

2020–2021
Rida competed against Igor Tanabe at Quintet Fight Night 5 on October 27, 2020 and was submitted with a leglock. He then faced Nonso Ebede at Fight 2 Win 167 on March 20, 2021 and won a unanimous decision. Rida was then invited to compete against Sloan Clymer at Who's Number One: Lovato Jr. v Burns on April 30, 2021, winning another unanimous decision.

Rida returned to Who's Number One on June 18, 2021 to compete against Keenan Cornelius, but instead faced his student Miha Perhavec after Cornelius withdrew due to injury. He submitted Perhavec with an armbar, registering the fastest submission win in the promotion's history. This performance led to Rida being invited to compete in the heavyweight division of the Who's Number One Championships on September 25–26, 2021. He was submitted by the eventual champion Tim Spriggs in the opening round, but came back to defeat both Orlando Sanchez and Giancarlo Bodoni to win a bronze medal.

He then competed in the main event of Submission Underground 28 against Andy Varela on October 31, 2021, losing the match in EBI overtime.

2022
Rida returned to Who's Number One on March 25, 2022 to compete against Elder Cruz. He won the match after submitting Cruz with a rear-naked choke.

At the 2022 ADCC World Championship, Rida was invited to compete at the event for the very first time. He won an upset victory in the opening round, submitting multiple-champion Roberto "Cyborg" Abreu by arm-bar. Rida then lost on points in the quarter-final to Roosevelt Sousa. He returned to compete in the absolute division at the same event, but went out in the opening round to the 88kg champion Giancarlo Bodoni.

Rida was invited to take part in a tournament shortly afterward at EBI 20: The Absolutes on October 23, 2022. He withdrew from the event shortly before it took place however, and did not compete. Rida was then invited to compete in an absolute grand prix at UFC Fight Pass Invitational 3 on December 13, 2022. He was submitted in Patrick Gaudio with a triangle choke in the opening round.

2023
Rida was set to compete against fellow ADCC 2022 veteran Vinicius 'Trator' Ferreira at Grapple in the Temple 3 on January 27, 2023. He lost the match by decision.

Brazilian Jiu-Jitsu competitive summary 
Main Achievements (black belt):
 IBJJF American Nationals No-Gi Champion (2020 / 2021)
 Quintet Fight Night II Champion (2019)
 2nd place Pan-American No-Gi Championship (2022)
 2nd place Quintet II Challenge (2018)
 3rd place IBJJF American Nationals No-Gi (2020)
 3rd place UAEJJF Grand Slam Tokyo (2019)
 3rd FloGrappling’s WNO Championships (2021)

Main Achievements (colored belt):
 IBJJF Asian Open Champion (2018)
 JBJJF All Japan Champion (2017/2018)
 2nd place UAEJJF Grand Slam Tokyo (2017 brown)
 3rd place IBJJF European Open (2018 brown)
 3rd place UAEJJF Abu Dhabi Pro (2018 brown)

Notes

References

Living people
People awarded a black belt in Brazilian jiu-jitsu
Ghanaian practitioners of Brazilian jiu-jitsu
Ghanaian expatriates in Japan